Kunzeana is a genus of leafhoppers in the family Cicadellidae. There are more than 30 described species in Kunzeana.

Species
These 37 species belong to the genus Kunzeana:

 Kunzeana acaciae Ruppel & DeLong, 1951
 Kunzeana aurulenta (Lawson, 1930)
 Kunzeana benedicti (Beamer, 1943)
 Kunzeana caldwelli Ruppel & DeLong, 1952
 Kunzeana carmenae Ruppel & DeLong, 1952
 Kunzeana curiosa (Beamer, 1945)
 Kunzeana deschoni (Baker, 1903)
 Kunzeana deserta Ruppel & DeLong, 1952
 Kunzeana ebena Ruppel & DeLong, 1952
 Kunzeana eburata Ruppel & DeLong, 1952
 Kunzeana flavella Ruppel & DeLong, 1952
 Kunzeana furcata (Beamer, 1943)
 Kunzeana galbana Ruppel & DeLong, 1952
 Kunzeana hebea Ruppel & DeLong, 1952
 Kunzeana kunzei (Gillette, 1898)
 Kunzeana lenta (McAtee, 1926)
 Kunzeana meta Ruppel & DeLong, 1952
 Kunzeana munda (Beamer, 1943)
 Kunzeana myersi (McAtee, 1926)
 Kunzeana parrai Ruppel & DeLong, 1952
 Kunzeana popae Ruppel & DeLong, 1951
 Kunzeana raia Ruppel & DeLong, 1952
 Kunzeana rosea (Osborn, 1928)
 Kunzeana salicis (Beamer, 1943)
 Kunzeana sandersi (Ball & DeLong, 1925)
 Kunzeana scimetara Ruppel & DeLong, 1952
 Kunzeana semiluna Ruppel & DeLong, 1951
 Kunzeana spinosa Ruppel & DeLong, 1952
 Kunzeana tamazella Ruppel & DeLong, 1952
 Kunzeana tenera (Beamer, 1943)
 Kunzeana tessellata Ruppel & DeLong, 1951
 Kunzeana texana (Beamer, 1943)
 Kunzeana usitata Ruppel & DeLong, 1952
 Kunzeana versicolora Ruppel & DeLong, 1951
 Kunzeana vomerella Ruppel & DeLong, 1952
 Kunzeana youngi Ruppel & DeLong, 1952
 Kunzeana zantedeschia Coelho, Da-Silva & Nessimian, 2014

References

Cicadellidae genera
Articles created by Qbugbot
Dikraneurini